The 2001 Amstel Gold Race was the 36th edition of the annual road bicycle race "Amstel Gold Race", held on Sunday April 28, 2001 in the Limburg province, The Netherlands. The race stretched 257 kilometres, with the start and finish in Maastricht. There were a total of 190 competitors, with 37 finishing the race.

Result

External links
Results

Amstel Gold Race
2001 in road cycling
2001 in Dutch sport
Amstel Gold Race
April 2001 sports events in Europe